George Patrick Malley (February 28, 1931 – May 18, 1985) was an American football coach. He served as the Santa Clara University head coach from 1959 until his death in 1985.

Early life and education
Born in San Francisco, Malley graduated from St. Ignatius College Preparatory in 1949. Malley then attended the University of Santa Clara, where he played at offensive guard and linebacker on the football team in 1950 and 1951 before graduating from the university in 1953. Malley was part of the Santa Clara 1950 Orange Bowl championship team.

Coaching career
In 1952, Malley coached the Santa Clara freshman team. After graduating from Santa Clara, Malley served in the 4th Armored Division of the United States Army. Malley returned to coaching in 1956 when he became head coach at his alma mater St. Ignatius Prep.

Resurrecting the football program after a seven-year hiatus, the University of Santa Clara hired Malley as head coach in 1959. Malley amassed a 141–100–4 record with only five losing seasons. Malley also added athletic director to his duties at the university in 1965.

Mark Purdy of the San Jose Mercury News credited Malley with a revival of football at Santa Clara after the school relegated its team to the Division II level. Purdy wrote, "Malley was the grandfather or uncle who looked after everyone. The men who played for him still talk of him today in reverent tones."

Malley died of cancer on May 18, 1985. The Pat Malley Fitness and Recreation Center opened on the Santa Clara campus in 1999 was named in his honor. His father, George Malley, played football at Santa Clara and coached the University of San Francisco football team. His son, Terry Malley, succeeded him as Santa Clara head coach.

Head coaching record

College

References

Additional sources
 Santa Clara's Malley Exemplifies Courage - The NCAA News - October 10, 1983, Volume 20 Number 35

1931 births
1985 deaths
American football linebackers
American football offensive guards
High school football coaches in California
Players of American football from San Francisco
Santa Clara Broncos athletic directors
Santa Clara Broncos football coaches
Santa Clara Broncos football players
United States Army officers